Sloppy the Psychotic is a 2012 American independent slasher horror film directed, co-written, produced and cinematographed by Mike O'Mahony (who also stars in the film as the title role, along with James Costa who is the film's music composer) which follows a children's birthday party clown who suffers a mental breakdown and embarks on a psychotic killing spree. The film also stars Lauren Ojeda, Lewis Beaver, Norm Copsetta Jr., Stacey Fitzpatrick and Fred Ficke. Sloppy the Psychotic was theatrically released in the United States on February 25, 2012 by Maniac Films.

Synopsis
Sloppy (Mike O'Mahony) is a children's birthday party clown that has had a terrible time of life. His girlfriend has broken up with him, he's been fired, and his friends are unsupportive and cruel. This proves to be too much for him and he undergoes a psychotic break, which causes him to go on a murdering spree.

Cast
 Mike O'Mahony as Sloppy the Clown
 James Costa as Danny
 Lauren Ojeda as Sandy
 Lewis Beaver as Mr. Jenkins
 Stacey Fitzpatrick as Sheryl
 Fred Ficke as Bum
 Norm Copsetta Jr. as Mime

Release
Sloppy the Psychotic was theatrically released in the United States on February 25, 2012 by Maniac Films.

Reception
Ain't It Cool News gave a mostly positive review for the film, writing "While there are a lot of obvious jokes and bad acting, for no budget, this has some pretty twisted moments. Plus there’s the added benefit of clown sex, which is always amusing. All in all, as far as sleaze goes, SLOPPY THE PSYCHOTIC is better than most no-budgeters." HorrorNews.net was more negative in their review, stating "Mike O’Mahony made the type of film that he wanted to make on his own terms. For that I will applaud him. For me, I just couldn’t connect to the material and enjoy it."

Music
 "Murder Stories" - Nettles
 "Alone" - Polterchrist
 "Engulfed By The Swarm" - Polterchrist
 "Cold Sweat and Butterfly's" - Old Man Savage
 "Hell's Embrace" - Old Man Savage
 "Pop Goes The Weasel" - Kevin MacLeod
 "Scheming Weasel" - Kevin MacLeod
 "Cuz I Got Paper (You Wish You Had)" - Fallacious and G-Rex
 "I'm Gone" - Fallacious

References

External links
 
 

2012 films
2012 horror films
American exploitation films
American independent films
American splatter films
Horror films about clowns
2010s English-language films
2010s American films